An offline reader (sometimes called an offline browser or offline navigator) is computer software that downloads e-mail, newsgroup posts or web pages, making them available when the computer is offline: not connected to a server.  Offline readers are useful for portable computers and dial-up access.

Variations

Website-mirroring software

Website mirroring software is software that allows for the download of a copy of an entire website to the local hard disk for offline browsing. In effect, the downloaded copy serves as a mirror of the original site. Web crawler software such as Wget can be used to generate a site mirror.

Offline mail and news readers

Offline mail readers are computer programs that allow users to read electronic mail or other messages (for example, those on bulletin board systems) with a minimum of connection time to the server storing the messages. BBS servers accomplished this by packaging up multiple messages into a compressed file, e.g., a QWK packet, for the user to download using, e.g., Xmodem, Ymodem, Zmodem, and then disconnect. The user reads and replies to the messages locally and packages up and uploads any replies or new messages back to the server upon the next connection. Internet mail servers using POP3 or IMAP4 send the messages uncompressed as part of the protocol, and outbound messages using SMTP are also uncompressed. Offline news readers using NNTP are similar, but the messages are organized into news groups.

Most e-mail protocols, like the common POP3 and IMAP4 used for internet mail, need be on-line only during message transfer; the same applies to the NNTP protocol used by Usenet (Network news).  Most end-user mailers, such as Outlook Express and AOL, can be used offline even if they are mainly intended to be used online, but some mailers such as Juno are mainly intended to be used offline.

Off-line mail readers are generally considered to be those systems that did not originally offer such functionality, notably on bulletin board systems where toll charges and tying up telephone lines were a major concern. Users of large networks such as FidoNet regularly used offline mail readers, and it was also used for UseNet messages on the internet, which is also an online system. The two most common formats for FidoNet BBS's were Blue Wave and QWK. Less well-known examples include Silver Xpress's OPX, XRS, OMEM, SOUP and ZipMail.

List

See also
Online and offline
Cache manifest in HTML5 (deprecated in favor of service workers)
Progressive web application
Kiwix, Wikipedia offline reader
WebWhacker
Comparison of software saving Web pages for offline use

Notes

References

Email
Web applications